Hires Big H is a restaurant chain headquartered in Sandy, Utah.

Hires Drive-In was founded in 1959 by Don Hale, a former grocer, with the assistance of his wife Shirley Hickman. In addition to the flagship branch located near the center of Salt Lake City, there are additional locations in Midvale and West Valley City.

Noted for honoring the tradition of the drive-in restaurants of the 1950s—both in its menu and interior decoration—the restaurants have achieved national recognition in publications like the American Automobile Association's Via magazine. Like many other Utah restaurants, it offers the regional condiment called fry sauce.  Hires fry sauce can be found in grocery stores around the state.

Don Hale died of natural causes at the age of 93 on Saturday, January 29, 2011, in Salt Lake City, Utah.

References

External links
Official website

Restaurants in Utah
Fast-food chains of the United States
Regional restaurant chains in the United States
Root beer stands
Buildings and structures in Salt Lake City
Buildings and structures in Salt Lake County, Utah
Midvale, Utah
Restaurants established in 1959
1959 establishments in Utah
Buildings and structures in Sandy, Utah